Casalarreina is a town located in the province of La Rioja, Spain.

The first documents about the village were around 1170 by Aldonza Ruiz de Castro.

The town borders the Basque-Aragonese freeway. In 2011, there were 1,355 inhabitants.INE

Demographics

Politics

Points of interest

Monastery of Santa Maria de la Piedad

Church of Saint Martin

Pobes Family Palace

Palace of the Constable of Castile

Hermitage of San Román de Ajuarte

Bridge over the Oja river

References

External links

 IDERIOJA Visualizador Municipal
 Historic preservation in Spain

Municipalities in La Rioja (Spain)